Neidi (內地) is a Chinese term which can refer to:

China proper
Mainland China

See also
Names of China